Wilhelm Fredrik Effern (21 January 1907 – 28 May 1990) was a Dutch middle-distance runner. He competed for the Netherlands in the men's 1500 metres at the 1928 Summer Olympics.

References

External links
 

1907 births
1990 deaths
Athletes (track and field) at the 1928 Summer Olympics
Dutch male middle-distance runners
Olympic athletes of the Netherlands
People from Vlaardingen
Sportspeople from South Holland
20th-century Dutch people